Tersky (masculine), Terskaya (feminine), or Terskoye (neuter) is the name of several rural localities in Russia:
Tersky, Budyonnovsky District, Stavropol Krai, a settlement in Tersky Selsoviet of Budyonnovsky District of Stavropol Krai
Tersky, Georgiyevsky District, Stavropol Krai, a settlement in Alexandriysky Selsoviet of Georgiyevsky District of Stavropol Krai
Terskoye, Krasnoyarsk Krai, a village in Tersky Selsoviet of Kansky District of Krasnoyarsk Krai
Terskoye, Tambov Oblast, a selo in Tersky Selsoviet of Michurinsky District of Tambov Oblast
Terskaya, a stanitsa in Terskoye Rural Settlement of Mozdoksky District of the Republic of North Ossetia–Alania